Angelo Schirinzi (born 5 November 1972) is a beach soccer player and coach. He is Coach of Switzerland national beach soccer team, and the formerTahiti national beach soccer team Coach 2012-2015. He is the main developer of beach soccer in Switzerland.

Schirinzi has been a FIFA Expert since 2008 and has supervised more than 35 seminars in the last years.

Awards

2002	Best Scorer EBSL Alanya
2002	Best Scorer EBSL Montpellier
2002	Top Scorer EBSL North Group
2002	Prince Albert Monaco Selection Team
2003	Most Valuable Player EBSL Linz
2004	8. Platz X. World Championships
2004	Best Scorer EBSL Final Monaco
2005	Best Scorer Master Cup Amneville
2005	Winner EBSL Group C
2005	European Champion Euro Beach Soccer Cup 2005 in Moscow
2006	Winner EBSL Linz
2006	Winner EBSL Scheveningen
2007	Winner Pro Beach Soccer Tour Winterthur
2007	Top Scorer Pro Beach Soccer Tour
2007	Winner Euro Beach Soccer Nations Cup Linz
2007	Best Scorer Euro Beach Soccer Nations Cup Linz
2007	Winner Euro Beach Soccer Qualifyer Athens
2008	Winner 4-Nations Cup Eger (HUN)
2008	5. Place FIFA Beach Soccer Qualifyer in Benidorm
2008	Winner EBSL Group A Lignano (ITA)
2008	Winner EURO-Nationscup Linz (AUT)
2008	Vice-Champion Euro Beach Soccer Cup in Baku (Azerbaidjan)
2008	Winner Danubia Cup Bratislava (SLO)
2008	Winner South Russian Championship mit Rostov in Anapa (RUS)
2009	Vice-Champion Euro Beach Soccer Cup in Rome (Ita)
2009	Vice World Champion of FIFA Beach Soccer World Cup in Dubai
2010	Winner Euro Beach Soccer League Lignano (Italy)
2010	4. Place FIFA Beach Soccer Qualifyer 2010 in Bibione 
2010	Winner Euro Beach Soccer League Den Haag (Netherland)
2010	Winner Ge Money Bank Beach Soccer Tour Zurich Main Station
2011	Winner EBSL Ravenna (Ita)
2011	10. Place FIFA Beach Soccer World Cup in Ravenna / Italy
2011	Intercontinental Cup Dubai
2012	Winner Euro Beach Soccer League Terracina, Italy
2012	Winner BSWW World Tour Al Jadida, Marocco
2012	Winner Euro Beach Soccer League Torredembarra, Spain
2012	European Champion 2012 Euro Beach Soccer League Finale Den Haag
2013	Runner Up Nations Cup Santos, Brasil
2013	Winner Euro Beach Soccer League Valence, France
2014	Runner-Up FIFA Beach Soccer Qualifyer 2014 Jesolo
2014	Runner-Up Euro Beach Soccer Cup in Baku, Azerbaidjan
2014	Winner Euro Beach Soccer League in Catania, Italia
2015	Winner EBSL Siofok, Hungary
2015	Winner Thailand Cup, Bangkok
2015	4. Place European Olympic Games in Baku, Azerbaidjan
2015	1/4 Finals FIFA World Cup in Espinho, Portugal
2016	Winner Copa Lagos, Nigeria
2016	Vice Champion FIFA Beach Soccer Qualifyer, Jesolo
2016	Runner-Up EBSL in Moskau, Russia
2016	Winner EBSL Sanxenxo, Spain
2016	Winner Kalik Cup Nassau, Bahamas
2017	5. Place FIFA Beach Soccer World Cup, Bahamas
2017	Winner Beach Soccer Cup, Marocco
2017	Runner-Up EBSL Moskau, Russia
2017	Runner-Up International Beach Soccer Grand Prix GuangZou, China
2018	Runner-Up EBSL Moskau, Russia
2018	Runner-Up EBSL Baku, Azerbaidjan
2019	Bronze Medal European Games, Minsk
2019	Qualification World Beach Games, Qatar
2019	Qualification Fifa Beach Soccer World Cup, Paraguay
2020	Runner Up EBSL Superfinale Nazare, Portugal
2021	FIFA Beach Soccer World Cup Moscow, Russia, Bronze Medal
2022	Beach Soccer European Champion 2022 Sardegna Italy

Awards with other Teams than Swiss National Team
2013	Tahiti National Team: 4. Place FIFA Beach Soccer World Cup Tahiti
2013	Swiss Champion with Sable Dancers
2018	BSC Kristall Winner Intercup
2018	BSC Kristall Winner Russia Supercup
2018	BSC Kristall Winner Nazare Cup
2018	BSC Kristall Winner Russia Championship
2019	BSC Kristall Winner Nazare Cup
2019	BSC Kristall Winner Russia Championship
2020	BSC Kristall Winner Nazare Cup
2020	BSC Kristall Winner Euro Winner Cup (CHAMPIONS LEAGUE OF BEACH SOCER)
2021	BSC Kristall Winner Russia Championship
2021	BSC Kristall Winner Nazare Cup
2021	BSC Kristall Winner Euro Winner Cup (CHAMPIONS LEAGUE OF BEACH SOCER)

Biography

Schirinzi was born in Basel. He was a professional footballer until the age of 26. During his short grass career, he played for FC Riehen and FC Solothurn. He then switched to being a professional trainer. In 2001, at the age of 30, he switched to playing beach soccer with the Sable Dancers of Bern. He also became coach-player of the Swiss beach soccer team.

Schirinzi has been a FIFA instructor since 2008, UEFA PRO coach and partner of Swiss Beach Soccer GMBH, the company that manages beach soccer in Switzerland. He has a UEFA Pro License , wrote the Beach Soccer manual.

After the Swiss team failed to qualify for the 2013 World Cup, Schirinzi accepted the position of coach of the Tahitian national team. He won these 6 preparation matches against France and the Netherlands. Organizer of the World Cup, the Tiki-Toa won an unexpected 4th place. He later won the Swiss championship with his team.

In October 2013 he was appointed a knight of the Order of Tahiti Nui.

References

Living people
1972 births
People from Basel-Stadt
Switzerland international footballers
Beach soccer in French Polynesia
Recipients of the Order of Tahiti Nui